Walter Jennings Slagle (December 15, 1878 – June 14, 1974) was a pitcher in Major League Baseball. He played for the Cincinnati Reds in 1910.

References

External links

1878 births
1974 deaths
Major League Baseball pitchers
Cincinnati Reds players
Baseball players from Ohio
Toledo Mud Hens players
Youngstown Puddlers players
Oswego Grays players
Elmira Pioneers players
Davenport River Rats players
Los Angeles (minor league baseball) players
Helena Senators players
Spokane Indians players
Portland Browns players
St. Paul Saints (AA) players
Indianapolis Indians players
Louisville Colonels (minor league) players
Los Angeles Angels (minor league) players
Sacramento Wolves players
Mission Wolves players
Wichita Witches players
Omaha Rourkes players
Vernon Tigers players
People from Kenton, Ohio